Depressive may refer to:
Major depressive disorder
Dysthymia
Minor depressive disorder
Recurrent brief depression
Depressive personality disorder
Depression (mood)

See also
Depression (disambiguation)